Antoine Thomas (25 January 1644 – 29 June 1709) was a Jesuit priest from the Spanish Netherlands, and missionary and astronomer in Qing China. His Chinese name was 安多.

Early life 
Born in Namur, Belgium in 1644, Thomas joined the Society of Jesus (the Jesuits) in 1660 and first taught in the schools of Armentières, Huy and Tournai. Equipped with a thorough training in Mathematics and Astronomy he was sent, at his own request, as missionary to China (1677). After a long and difficult sea journey - passing through Goa, Siam (Thailand), and Malacca - he reached Macau in 1682 just in time to observe an eclipse of the Sun (1683).

At the Chinese imperial court 
Thomas was called by the aging Father Ferdinand Verbiest, who had just found himself appointed 'vice-president of the Tribunal of Mathematics', (a very important and influential post in the Qing Empire of China), to join him in Beijing. After the death of Verbiest in 1688, Thomas took his place as the main mathematician and astronomical expert of China. For twenty years he was then a close adviser to the Kangxi Emperor who, beyond scientific questions, consulted him also on moral and religious matters. In 1692, he obtained an 'edict of tolerance' that gave to the missionaries almost complete freedom to preach Christianity.

Chinese Rites controversy 

At a time when the future of Christian faith seemed to be bright in China, the Chinese Rites controversy was raging in Europe. Charles-Thomas Maillard de Tournon, a papal legate, arrived in Beijing in 1705 purportedly to inquire on the orthodoxy of the Chinese rites (particularly the 'Veneration of Ancestors' ritual, accepted by the Jesuits). In fact Tournon's mind was made up. By completely disregarding Chinese customs and etiquette, he offended the Kangxi Emperor who had first received him well. No pleading of Antoine Thomas, then Superior of the Jesuits in China, could prevent Tournon from issuing a decree from Nanjing (1707) obliging the missionaries under severe penalties to abolish those rites. A last desperate attempt of Thomas, beseeching the legate to defer the implementation of the decree until further news was received from Rome, fell on deaf ears. Thomas died soon after in 1709 in Beijing, and was buried close to his friend and predecessor Ferdinand Verbiest in the Jesuits' Zhalan Cemetery in Beijing.

Main work 

Synopsis mathematica, Douai, 1685.

See also

List of Belgians
Religion in China
Christianity in China
Jesuit China missions
Roman Catholicism in China

References
Bontinck, F., La lutte autour de la liturgie chinoise au XVII et XVIIIème siècles, Louvain, 1962.
Thomaz de Bossierre, Yves, Un Belge Mandarin à la cour de Chine, Paris, 1977.

1644 births
1709 deaths
People from Namur (city)
Jesuits of the Spanish Netherlands
Jesuit missionaries in China
Jesuit scientists
Missionary linguists
Astronomers of the Spanish Netherlands